Popular Front for Armed Resistance, or PFAR, was a terrorist outfit formed during the 1960s. The group is responsible for series of bomb blasts in Pakistan. PFAR aim was independence of Baloch region from Pakistan. There has been no accurate independent estimate of the size or strength of PFAR. Most of outfit's activists were trained in Afghanistan. For the outfit, Afghanistan was good place to obtain weaponry and others goods.

In 1974, PFAR carried out series of bomb attacks in various cities of Pakistan. The outfit also claimed responsibility for bomb explosions at a political rally in Karachi. The political rally was to be attended by Zulfiqar Ali Bhutto. In the same year, Pakistani security forces launched series of counter-terrorism operation against the outfit. Iran also offered external assistance to these counter-terrorism operations. Iran supplied Pakistan with Gun-ship helicopters and pilots to assist Pakistan.

As a result of the counter-terrorism operations, the outfit was considerably weakened and it lost its ability to carry out guerilla attacks against Pakistan. Currently it is not known if the outfit is still active or not.

See also
 Balochistan conflict
 Balochistan Liberation Army
 Balochistan Liberation Front
 Baluch People's Liberation Front
 Baloch Students Organization
 Baloch Students Organization- Awami

References

Baloch nationalist militant groups
Rebel groups in Pakistan
Paramilitary organisations based in Pakistan
Balochistan
National liberation movements
Separatism in Pakistan